Nohow on is a collection of three prose pieces by Samuel Beckett, comprising Company, Ill Seen Ill Said, and Worstward Ho. It was first published in one volume in 1989.

References 

1989 books
Short stories by Samuel Beckett